Mary Bowers may refer to:

 Mary Bowers (journalist) (born 1985), British journalist for The Times
 Mary Bowers (ship), blockade runner, shipwrecked in 1864
 Mary Helen Bowers (born 1979), American ballerina

Bowers, Mary